Hemidactylus graniticolus is a cryptic rock-dwelling species of large gecko found in India. The holotype was described from hills near Harohalli village in the Bangalore Rural District, Karnataka.

Etymology

The species is named graniticolus because it dwells upon the granite rock formations.

References

Hemidactylus
Lizards of Asia
Reptiles of India
Reptiles described in 2011